Walter Nortman was a member of the Wisconsin State Assembly.

Biography
Nortman was born in Wauwatosa, Wisconsin. He interned at Harley-Davidson before graduating from the University of Wisconsin Law School.

Political career
Nortman was a member of the Assembly from 1939 to 1940. He was a Republican.

References

People from Wauwatosa, Wisconsin
Republican Party members of the Wisconsin State Assembly
University of Wisconsin Law School alumni
Year of birth missing
Year of death missing
Place of death missing